El diario de Mariana ( And Also Known As Stylelized DDM Since 2015 To Ending 2019) was an Argentine talk show, hosted by Mariana Fabbiani. It was aired by El Trece. It was released to be premiere On May 20, 2013 to Concluded On December 30, 2019

Argentine television talk shows
2013 Argentine television series debuts